The City of Mildura was a local government area on the Murray River, in northwestern Victoria, Australia.

History

Mildura was initially part of the Swan Hill Road District, which covered basically all of what is now northwestern Victoria. Swan Hill was incorporated on 8 July 1862, and became a shire on 14 August 1871. On 10 January 1890, the Shire of Mildura was incorporated from parts of the Lower Murray Riding.

A new shire, Walpeup, was formed in western Victoria on 1 October 1911, taking in some southern areas of Mildura and sections of five other shires. A small part of the shire in and near Mildura was severed on 18 May 1920, and incorporated as a borough, which became the Town of Mildura on 17 July 1922, and the City of Mildura on 21 March 1934. Parts of the Sandilong and Lake Ridings were annexed to the city on 1 October 1971.

On 20 January 1995, the City of Mildura was abolished, and along with the Shires of Mildura and Walpeup, was merged into the newly created Rural City of Mildura.

Wards
The City of Mildura was not divided into wards, and its nine councillors represented all electors of the city.

Population

* Estimate in the 1958 Victorian Year Book.

References

External links
 Victorian Places - Mildura

Mildura City
1920 establishments in Australia
Mildura